Fiestas Patrias  in Mexico originated in the 19th century and are observed today as five public holidays.

Aniversario de la Constitución
This day commemorates the Constitution of 1917, promulgated after the Mexican Revolution on February 5.  Article 74 of the Mexican federal labor law (Ley Federal del Trabajo) provides that the first Monday of February (regardless of the date) will be an official holiday in Mexico marking this occasion. This was a modification of the law made in 2005, effective since 2006; before that, it was celebrated on February 5 regardless of the day of the week in which the date occurred.

Natalicio de Benito Juárez
This day commemorates President Benito Juárez's birthday on March 21, 1806. Juárez is popularly regarded as Mexico's greatest president, who instituted the separation of Church and State in the La Reforma (Liberal Reform in Mexico). Juárez is recognized as a hero across the Americas for his resistance to European recolonization. Article 74 of the Mexican labor law (Ley Federal del Trabajo) provides that the third Monday of March (regardless the date) will be an official holiday in Mexico. As with Constitution Day, the holiday was originally celebrated every year on the same date (March 21), but the federal labor law was modified in 2005 so the holiday is always celebrated on a Monday.

Labor Day
Día del Trabajo commemorates the Mexican workers' union movements on May 1 — specifically, the 1906 Cananea, Sonora, and the 1907 Río Blanco, Veracruz, labor unrest and repression.

Labor Day in Mexico traces its origins to the 1886 Haymarket massacre in Chicago, but the first Labor Day in Mexico was when 20,000 workers marched against President Victoriano Huerta demanding fair working conditions in 1913. In 1923, President Álvaro Obregón declared May 1 the Día del Trabajo en México, but the day was officially established by Plutarco Elías Calles in 1925.

Grito de Dolores and Aniversario de la Independencia

Grito de Dolores (on the evening of September 15) and Aniversario de la Independencia (September 16) commemorate Father Miguel Hidalgo y Costilla's Grito de Dolores — on September 16, 1810, in the village of Dolores, near Guanajuato. Hidalgo called for the end of Spanish rule in Mexico. On October 18, 1825, the Republic of Mexico officially declared September 16 its national Independence Day (Dia de la Independencia).

Mexican Independence day, also referred to as Dieciséis de septiembre, is celebrated from the evening of September 15 with a re-creation of the Grito de Dolores by all executive office-holders (from the President of the Republic down to municipal presidents) and lasts through the night.

Aniversario de la Revolución

This day commemorates the Mexican Revolution which started on November 20, 1910 when Francisco I. Madero planned an uprising against dictator Porfirio Díaz's 31-year-long iron rule. Article 74 of the Mexican labor law (Ley Federal del Trabajo) provides that the third Monday of November (regardless the date) will be an official holiday in Mexico.  This was a modification of the law made in 2005, effective since 2006; before then, it was November 20 regardless of the day, and all schools gave extended holidays if the day was a Tuesday or Thursday. Although November 20 is the official day, the uprising started on different days in different parts of the country.

Confusion regarding Cinco de mayo
Contrary to common misconception in the U.S.,
Cinco de mayo is not Mexico's "Independence Day", but rather commemorates the victory of Mexican Republican forces over French forces in the first Battle of Puebla on May 5, 1862. In the battle fought there the following year the French forces were the victor.

In contrast to Independence Day, described above, Cinco de mayo is observed mostly at a local level in Puebla State and is a minor Bank Holiday in the rest of Mexico. Many labor unions have negotiated to have the day off, however, since its proximity to Labor Day (May 1) often allows an extended five-day weekend or two consecutive three-day weekends. The first observance of Cinco de Mayo was in Los Angeles, California, in 1863. The observance sought to boost the spirits of American and Mexican residents during the dark days of the American Civil War and the Franco-Mexican War. Puebla would not hold its own celebrations until after the French were driven out of the city a few years later. See: Hayes-Bautista, Dr. David E. El Cinco de Mayo: An American Tradition. Berkeley, University of California Press, 2012. ISBN 978-0-520-27212-5.

See also
 Flag flying days in Mexico
 Holidays and celebrations in Mexico

References

 
Mexican culture
Cultural festivals in Mexico
Folk festivals in Mexico